Joseph Francis Lamb (December 6, 1887 – September 3, 1960) was an American composer of ragtime music. Lamb, of Irish descent, was the only non-African American of the "Big Three" composers of classical ragtime, the other two being Scott Joplin and James Scott. The ragtime of Joseph Lamb ranges from standard popular fare to complex and highly engaging. His use of long phrases was influenced by classical works he had learned from his sister and others while growing up, but his sense of structure was potentially derived from his study of Joplin's piano rags. By the time he added some polish to his later works in the 1950s, Lamb had mastered the classic rag genre in a way that almost no other composer was able to approach at that time, and continued to play it passably as well, as evidenced by at least two separate recordings done in his home, as well as a few recorded interviews.

Life and career

Lamb was born in Montclair, New Jersey. The youngest of four children, he taught himself to play the piano and admired the early ragtime publications of Scott Joplin. He dropped out of St. Jerome's College in 1904 to work for a dry goods company. He met Joplin in 1907 while purchasing the latest Joplin and Scott sheet music in the offices of John Stark & Son. Joplin was impressed with Lamb's compositions and recommended him to ragtime publisher John Stark. Stark published Lamb's music for the next decade, starting with "Sensation".

Lamb's twelve rags published by Stark from 1908 to 1919 can be divided into two groups. The "heavy" rags are incorporated with Joplin's melody–dominated style and Scott's expansive use of the keyboard registers. This style includes "Ethiopia Rag" (1909), "Excelsior Rag" (1909), "American Beauty Rag" (1913), "Nightingale Rag" (1915), and "The Top Liner Rag" (1916). The "light" rags with the cakewalk tradition show the narrow-range melodies inspired by Joplin. This style of rags includes "Champagne Rag" (1910), "Cleopatra Rag" (1915), "Reindeer: Ragtime Two Step" (1915), and "Bohemia Rag" (1919). "Contentment Rag" (1915) and "Patricia Rag" (1916) have characteristics of both "heavy" and "light" rags.

Lamb used sequence for development purposes. He emphasized the harmonic sonority of the diminished seventh with upper-neighbor appoggiatura. He surpassed ragtime's usual four-measure phrase structure.

In 1911, Lamb married Henrietta Schultz and moved to Brooklyn, New York. He worked as an arranger for the J. Fred Helf Music Publishing Company and later, starting in April 1914, as an accountant for L. F. Dommerich & Company. Henrietta died of influenza in 1920 about the same time that popular music interest shifted from ragtime to jazz. Lamb stopped publishing his music, playing and composing only as a hobby. "Bohemia Rag" was published in 1919.

With the revival of interest in ragtime in the 1950s, Lamb shared his memories of Joplin and other early ragtime figures with music historians. Many were surprised to find that not only was he still living but that he was white. He composed new rags, brought out compositions that had never been published, and made recordings. A year before his death in 1960 the album Joseph Lamb: A Study in Classic Ragtime was released by Folkways Records. He died of a heart attack in Brooklyn at age 72.

Unpublished rags during his lifetime

"Alabama Rag"
"Alaskan Rag"
"Arctic Sunset"
"Bee Hive"
"Bird-Brain Rag"
"Blue Grass Rag"
"Chasin' the Chippies"
"Chime In"
"Cinders"
"Cottontail Rag"
"Crimson Ramblers"
"Firefly Rag"
"Good and Plenty Rag"
"Greased Lightning"
"Hot Cinders"
"Jersey Rag"
"Joe Lamb's Old Rag"
"The Old Home Rag"
"Ragged Rapids Rag"
"Ragtime Bobolink"
"Ragtime Special"
"Rapid Transit Rag"
"Shootin' the Works"
"Thoroughbred Rag"
"Toad Stool Rag"
"Walper House Rag"

References

Works cited

External links

"Patricia Lamb Conn: Connecting with Ragtime's Glory Days" - reminiscences of Lamb's daughter, with family photographs
Joseph Lamb Mini Biography
"Perfessor" Bill Edwards plays many Lamb rags, with stories
Article: "Joseph Lamb: The Humble Ragtime 'Sensation'" by Ted Tjaden
Lamb and his compositions on grainger.de

1887 births
1960 deaths
20th-century American composers
20th-century American male musicians
20th-century American pianists
American male composers
American male pianists
American people of Irish descent
Composers for piano
Ragtime composers
Ragtime pianists